Chukkalanti Ammayi Chakkanaina Abbayi is a 2013 Telugu romance film directed by Kanmani. It stars Tarun Kumar and Vimala Raman in the lead roles. The music was composed by Anup Rubens.

Plot
Sanjay, a carefree guy earning his income from a TV program in Bangkok comes across a medical student called Sameera and promptly woos her, asking her to live in with him, does Sameera agree and what lessons did Sanjay learn forms the basic crux of the plot.

Cast
 Tarun as Sanjay
 Vimala Raman as Sameera
 Brahmanandam
 Dharmavarapu Subramanyam
 Pragathi
 Chitram Seenu
 Y. Kasi Viswanath
 Raksha
 Vijay Sai
 Santosh Bapi (Guna Fame)

Soundtrack
Anup Rubens has composed the original score and soundtracks for the film. The Music was Released by Aditya Music

References

External links
 

2013 films
2010s Telugu-language films